The 1998 France rugby union tour of Australia and Fiji was a series of matches played in June 1998 in Argentina and Fiji by France national rugby union team.

Results

Bibliography

References

France
France national rugby union team tours
Rugby union tours of Argentina
Rugby union tours of Fiji
Argentina–France sports relations
Fiji–France sports relations
France
France
France